Manao may refer to:

Manao language
Manao Kagawa

See also
Mana'o (disambiguation)
Manaus